Alexandru Dimitrie Ghica (1 May 1796 – January 1862), a member of the Ghica family, was Prince of Wallachia from April 1834 to 7 October 1842 and later caimacam (regent) from July 1856 to October 1858.

Family 

He was son of Demetriu Ghica and Eufrosine Caradja.
His brothers were Grigore IV Ghica and Michai Ghica, father of Elena Ghica (pen-name Dora d'Istria).

Biography 
Alexandru was appointed jointly by the Ottoman Empire and Russia (1834–1842) as hospodar of Walachia. Under him the so-called  had been promulgated; an attempt was made to codify the laws in conformity with the institutions of the country and to secure better administration of justice.

At the end of his reign as Prince of Wallachia, he was replaced by the Russian-backed Gheorghe Bibescu.

He died in Naples in 1862.

References

Bibliography 

 
 
 
 
 

1796 births
1862 deaths
Alexandru II
Rulers of Wallachia
Regents and governors of Wallachia